There have been several treaties signed in Montevideo such as: 

1828 Treaty of Montevideo in which Brazil and Argentina recognized the independence of Uruguay, after British mediation.
Any of the treaties signed during the South American Congress of Private International Law of 1888-1889 or the South American Congress of Private International Law of 1939-1940 in Montevideo.
1890 Treaty of Montevideo signed between Argentina and Brazil to solve the so-called question of Palmas.
1960 Treaty of Montevideo established the Latin American Free Trade Association (LAFTA).
1979 Treaty of Montevideo (Act of Montevideo) signed between Chile and Argentina to allow the Papal mediation in the Beagle conflict.
1980 Treaty of Montevideo transformed LAFTA into Latin American Integration Association (ALADI).

See also
Montevideo Convention

History of Uruguay